John Hods(d)on Durand (1761-1830), of Carshalton, Surrey and West Dean Place, Sussex, was a British politician.

He was a Member (MP) of the Parliament of the United Kingdom for Maidstone 1802 to 1806.

References

1761 births
1830 deaths
People from Chichester District
Members of the Parliament of the United Kingdom for English constituencies
UK MPs 1802–1806
People from Carshalton
People from Maidstone